Tréjouls (Languedocien: Truèjols) is a commune in the Tarn-et-Garonne department in the Occitanie region in southern France.

Geography
The Barguelonne flows southwest through the commune.

See also
Communes of the Tarn-et-Garonne department

References

Communes of Tarn-et-Garonne